Johann Gottlieb Görner (16 April 1697 – 15 February 1778) was a German composer and organist.

Biography
Görner was born in Penig, Saxony. His brother was the composer Johann Valentin Görner and his son the organist Karl Friedrich Görner. He was a student at the Thomasschule zu Leipzig and University of Leipzig, then organist of the city's Paulinerkirche from 1716 (whose music director he became in 1723) then its Nikolaikirche from 1721. In 1723 he founded a Collegium Musicum, which competed with Johann Sebastian Bach's. He died in Leipzig.

References

External links
Görner Renaissance-Musikverlag

1697 births
1778 deaths
18th-century classical composers
18th-century German composers
18th-century keyboardists
18th-century German male musicians
German Baroque composers
German classical composers
German classical organists
German male classical composers
German male organists
Male classical organists